Canzani is a Spanish-language surname. Notable people with this surname include:

Carlos Canzani, 1980s Uruguayan rock musician
Joseph Canzani (1915–2008), American art teacher, president of Columbus College of Art and Design
Pájaro Canzani, Chilean rock musician, former member of Los Jaivas
Pia Nancy Canzani, competitor for Maryland in Miss World USA 1972 & Miss Maryland World 1972
Yaiza Canzani, Spanish and Uruguayan mathematician

Spanish-language surnames